Dameli (دَميلي), also Damia, Damiabaasha or Gidoj, is an Indo-Aryan language of the Dardic subgroup spoken by approximately 5,000 people in the Domel Town, in the Chitral District of Khyber-Pakhtunkhwa province of Pakistan.

The Domel or Damel Valley is about ten miles south of Drosh on the East Side of the Chitral or Kunar river, on the road from the Mirkhani Fort to the pass of Arandu.

Dameli is still the main language in the villages where it is spoken, and it is regularly learned by children. Most of the men speak Pashto as a second language, and some also speak Khowar and Urdu, but there are no signs of massive language change.

Study 
Emil Perder's 2013 dissertation, A Grammatical Description of Dameli, based on the author's field work, is the first comprehensive description of the Dameli language. Before Perder's work, the main source of information on Dameli was an article by Georg Morgenstierne, published in 1942: "Notes on Dameli: A Kafir-Dardic Language of the Chitral". A sociolinguistic survey written by Kendall Decker (1992) contains a chapter on Dameli.

Classification 
The language is classified as an Indo-Aryan language of the Dardic subgroup. The Dardic languages were first thought to be as an independent branch within Indo-Iranian, but today they are placed within Indo-Aryan following Morgenstierne's work.

Phonology

The following tables set out the phonology of the Dameli Language.

Vowels

Consonants

See also
 Languages of Pakistan
 Languages of Chitral

References

Further reading 

 Decker, Kendall D. (1992) Languages of Chitral. Sociolinguistic Survey of Northern Pakistan, 5. Islamabad: National Institute of Pakistan Studies, Quaid-i-Azam University and Summer Institute of Linguistics. xxii, 257 p. .
 Morgenstierne, Georg (1926) Report on a Linguistic Mission to Afghanistan. Instituttet for Sammenlignende Kulturforskning, Serie C I-2. Oslo. .
 Morgenstierne, Georg (1942) "Notes on Dameli. A Kafir-Dardic Language of Chitral." Norsk Tidsskrift for Sprogvidenskap Vol. 12: 115 - 198.
 Perder, Emil (2013) A Grammatical Description of Dameli. Dissertation, Stockholm: Department of Linguistics, Stockholm University. .

External links
 Georg Morgenstierne multimedia database
 Richard Strand's Nuristan site with relevant material on closely related languages in Afghanistan
Perder, Emily. A Grammatical Description of Dameli

Dardic languages
Languages of Chitral
Languages of Khyber Pakhtunkhwa